To is a 1964 Danish film that was directed by Palle Kjærulff-Schmidt and was entered into the 15th Berlin International Film Festival.

Cast
 Yvonne Ingdal as Lone
 Jens Østerholm as Niels
 Jørgen Bidstrup
 Birgit Brüel
 Christian Glatved
 Kjeld Jacobsen
 Peter Steen
 Lis Adelvard

References

External links

1964 films
1960s Danish-language films
Danish black-and-white films
Films directed by Palle Kjærulff-Schmidt